Rachel Khedoori (born 1964 in Sydney, Australia) is a contemporary artist of Iraqi Jewish heritage based in Los Angeles and known primarily for her mixed use of sculpture, film and architecture.

Biography
Khedoori was born in Sydney and raised in Australia. She is the identical twin sister of the artist Toba Khedoori, and the sister of David Khedoori. She is also the widow of artist Jason Rhoades.

Khedoori received her BFA from San Francisco Art Institute in 1988. She received her MFA from the University of California, Los Angeles, in 1994. She was a visiting professor at the Academy of Art, Malmö, Sweden in 1996. Khedoori began exhibiting in 1994, a joint debut show with her sister, Toba Khedoori.  Her first complete solo show gained international attention at Kunsthalle Basel and Kunstverein Braunschweig in 2001. Her exhibition in Basel focused on film projected onto 2-D and 3-D objects. Rachel's work blends life and the abstract use of film, sculpture and installation.

Khedoori has lived and worked in Los Angeles, California since 1990.

Exhibitions 

 Untitled (Blue Room), David Zwirner Gallery, New York City, New York (1999)
 Rachel Khedoori, Kunsthalle Basel, Basel, Switzerland (2001)
 Untitled (Iraq Book Project), Hauser & Wirth, London, England (2008)
 Untitled (Iraq Book Project), The Box, Los Angeles, California (2009)
 Paul McCarthy's Low Life Slow Life: Part 2, CCA Wattis Institute, San Francisco, California (2011)
 Untitled, Gisela Capitain, Cologne, Germany (2011)
 Rachel Khedoori, Hauser & Wirth New York, New York City, New York (2015)

See also
 Iraqi art
 List of Iraqi artists
 List of Iraqi women artists

References

External links 
 Rachel Khedoori - First solo project 
 Rachel Khedoori - Hauser & Wirth 
 New York Times - ART IN REVIEW

1964 births
Living people
Painters from California
Iraqi painters
Iraqi women painters
Identical twins
Artists from Sydney
Australian people of Iraqi-Jewish descent
Australian women painters
Australian emigrants to the United States
American people of Iraqi descent
American women painters
American people of Iraqi-Jewish descent
Jewish American artists
Australian twins
Iraqi contemporary artists
Iraqi women artists
20th-century American women artists
University of California, Los Angeles alumni
San Francisco Art Institute alumni
21st-century American women artists
21st-century American Jews